Tracey Moore (born January 17, 1960) is a Canadian voice actress and voice director. She is most noted as the voice of Princess Toadstool in the Adventures of Super Mario Bros. 3, Super Mario World, and the singing voice of Strawberry Shortcake in Strawberry Shortcake's Berry Bitty Adventures.

She was also briefly the voice of Serena/Sailor Moon in the North American version of the anime Sailor Moon for 13 consistent episodes before Terri Hawkes became the established voice for the titular character. She also voiced the Marvel character White Queen/Emma Frost as well as Jean Grey's Phoenix alter-ego in the 1992 X-Men series.

Moore also was the voice of the Dryad in Anne of Green Gables: The Animated Series, the titular character in George Shrinks, and Ned Flemkin in Ned's Newt.

She began her career primarily in musical theatre roles, most notably playing Anne Shirley in productions of Anne of Green Gables: The Musical in the 1980s. She has also had occasional live-action film roles, most notably in the 1990 film Defy Gravity; she was a Genie Award nominee for Best Supporting Actress at the 13th Genie Awards in 1992.

Moore toured in the United States playing Dorothy opposite Phyllis Diller's Wicked Witch of the West in The Wizard of Oz. She resides in Victoria, British Columbia, with her daughter.

Filmography

Film

Television

Casting and Voice Director
Moore also worked as a voice director for Sailor Moon, Bad Dog, Mythic Warriors: Guardians of the Legend, Highlander: The Animated Series, Corduroy, and Atomic Betty as well as a casting director on Bad Dog and Tales from the Cryptkeeper.

References

External links

1960 births
Living people
Actresses from Calgary
Canadian casting directors
Women casting directors
Canadian film actresses
Canadian musical theatre actresses
Canadian voice actresses
Canadian voice directors
20th-century Canadian actresses
21st-century Canadian actresses